HMAS Cerberus is a Royal Australian Navy (RAN) base that serves as the primary training establishment for RAN personnel. The base is located adjacent to Crib Point on the Mornington Peninsula, south of the Melbourne City Centre, Victoria, Australia. The base is also an official bounded locality of the Shire of Mornington Peninsula and is the only naval base to have a specific listing in the Australian census. A section of the base centred around the Parade Ground was added to the Australian Commonwealth Heritage List on 22 June 2004, known as the HMAS Cerberus Central Area Group.

History
The site for the Cerberus naval base on Hanns Inlet, between Sandy Point and Stony Point on Western Port Bay was purchased in 1911. The  base was opened in September 1920 and became known as Flinders Naval Depot in 1921. The Post Office opened on 2 December 1912 as Flinders Naval Base, was renamed Flinders Naval Depot in 1925 and HMAS Cerberus, Westernport in 1963. Cerberus now occupies most of Stony Point to the north and all of Sandy Point in the south.

From 1930 until 1958, Cerberus was the home of the Royal Australian Naval College, until it was clear that the base was becoming overcrowded and the College was moved back to HMAS Creswell. With the outbreak of World War II, many temporary buildings were erected to facilitate the training of wartime recruits. Many of these buildings were later demolished or replaced.

Facilities and operational units
The primary role of HMAS Cerberus has always been the training of RAN personnel. With the establishment of four tri-service schools over the last 13 years, this role has been extended to training Army and Air Force personnel. Specific courses offered include: the School of Survivability and Ship Safety which specialises in fire fighting, damage control and nuclear/biological/chemical defence; and seamanship and weapons training.

The base is also the home of the Recruit School – for all sailors their first contact with life in the RAN. HMAS Cerberus comprises numerous training and recreation facilities, two chapels and a small marina. Training is provided for about 6,000 personnel annually, averaging 800 trainees at any one time.

Training facilities
HMAS Cerberus currently host to the following naval training schools

RAN Recruit School
SSSS (School of Ship Safety and Survivability)
Boatswains Faculty
Defence Force School of Signals – Maritime Communications and Information Systems Wing
Engineering Faculty
Medical Training School
Supply School
Gunnery School
Small Arms Training School
WTSS Range
ADF School of Physical Fitness
ADF School of Catering
ADF Dental School

Crib Point Satellite Earth Station
HMAS Cerberus hosts the only dedicated weather-related Satellite Earth station in Australia, founded in 1991 and operated by the Bureau of Meteorology (BoM) to service China's first Turn Around Ranging Station (C-TARS) and servicing geostationary meteorological satellites, servicing Japan's Himawari or GMS-4 and GMS-5. In August [2016], the BoM installed through a contractor Av-Comm, the first Australian ground station for the Himawari 8 weather satellite service.

Recruit School

The RAN recruit school is where all full-time and reserve general entry sailors complete their training. The full-time recruit course is eleven weeks in duration, and gives sailors the skills and knowledge required to conduct basic duties in the RAN, and prepare them for their specialised roles. Recruits join the RAN in monthly intakes, and these recruits are placed into one of four divisions. The recruits stay with their division for the entire eleven-week course. Some of the training and education conducted in the recruit course are:

 Teamwork exercises
 Uniform wearing and maintenance
 Drill and discipline
 First aid
 Survival at sea
 Basic ship maintenance and corrosion control
 Operation and proficiency on the service firearm, the F88 Austeyr
 Ship and sea combat survivability
 Physical training and fitness
 Basic seamanship

Part of the course includes a two-and-a-half-day sea familiarisation course.

Engineering Faculty

The engineering faculty is where Marine Technicians, Electronics Technicians, Marine Engineer Officers and Electronics Engineer Officers complete their employment training.

Sport
The base has an Australian Rules football team competing in the Southern Football League, as well as a hockey club competing in the Hockey Victoria competition. Golfers play at the Cerberus (HMAS Cerberus) Golf Club  on Stony Point Road.

Memorials and colours
Numerous memorials are at the base with many including stained glass windows in the two chapels: Our Lady of the Sea (Catholic), and St Mark's (Anglican/interdenominational). St Mark's chapel also houses retired King's/Queen's colour flags of George V, George VI, and Elizabeth II.

See also
List of Royal Australian Navy bases

References

External links

RAN HMAS Cerberus official website
RAN Website for Recruit School

Royal Australian Navy bases
Military education and training in Australia
Buildings and structures in the Shire of Mornington Peninsula
Towns in Victoria (Australia)
Coastal towns in Victoria (Australia)
Western Port
Earth stations in Australia
1921 establishments in Australia
Military installations established in 1921
Military installations in Victoria (Australia)
Commonwealth Heritage List places in Victoria
Suburbs of the Shire of Mornington Peninsula